Boua was king of the southern Laotian Kingdom of Champasak from 1851 to 1852.

Kings of Champasak
Year of death missing
Year of birth missing
19th-century Laotian people